Leeds International School Nawalapitiya is an international school in Sri Lanka. English is the primary medium of instruction, with Sinhala and Tamil as compulsory second languages. The school's motto is "Aspire, Appraise, Accomplish."

Curriculum 

Leeds prepares students to take the English language Sri Lankan G.C.E(O/L) examinations. Children in grades three and above also take the Australian ICAS (International Competitions and Assessments for Schools) examination. Students also take the IPSCE (International Primary Schools Certificate Examination) in sixth grade, and the IJSCE (International Junior Schools Certificate Examination) in ninth grade.

Sports 

Leeds encourages students to participate in track and field events as well as athletic competitions conducted by the AISSL (Association for International Schools in Sri Lanka).

Extracurricular activities 

Leeds sponsors literary associations in English, Tamil, and Sinhala. The school has clubs for science, environmental studies, public speaking, and art. Other programs include Bud Sciences, Nature Lovers, Effective Orators, and Vision Charmers. The students publish a monthly journal, The Leader.

Students participate in an annual field trip, various exhibitions of classwork and creativity, and a year-end concert.

Health plan 
Doctors in Nawalapitiya conduct annual medical check-ups for all students.

Photos

References

International schools in Sri Lanka
Schools in Kandy District
Educational institutions established in 2004
2004 establishments in Sri Lanka